Bilge Su Koyun (born 3 July 1999) is a Turkish-born Azerbaijani footballer who plays as a midfielder for Turkish Women's First Football League club Fatih Vatan Spor and the Azerbaijan women's national team. She was part of the Turkey women's national under-19 football team, and later of the Azerbaijan national team.

Early life 
Koyun was born in Bahçelievler district of Istanbul Province, Turkey on 3 July 1999.

Club career 

Koyun obtained her license from Beşiktaş J.K. on 30 May, 2014. She started to play in the 2014–15 Turkey Women's Third League. Her team was promoted at the end of that season to the Second League. Her team finished the season as winner, and she enjoyed her team's promotion to the First League.

In the 2018–19 First League season, she transferred to Fatih Vatan Spor.

International career

Turkey 

Koyun was admitted to the Turkey girls' U-17 ream and debuted in the 2016 UEFA Women's Under-17 Championship qualification – Group 1 match against Ireland on 20 October 2015.

She was called up to the Turkey women's U-19 team to play in the 2016 UEFA Development Tournament, which became champion. She took part at the 2017 UEFA Women's U-19 Championship qualification – Group 10, 2017 UEFA Women's U-19 Championship qualification – Elite round Group 2, 2018 UEFA Women's U-19 Championship qualification – Group 10 and 2018 UEFA Women's U-19 Championship qualification – Elite round Group 4 matches. She appeared also in friendly matches.

Azerbaijan 
Koyun became a member of the Azerbaijan women's national football team. She played in six matches of the 2023 FIFA Women's World Cup qualification – UEFA Group E.

Career statistics 
.

Honours

Club 
 Turkish Women's First Football League
 Beşiktaş J.K.
 Runners-up (2): 2016–17, 2017–18

 Fatih Vatan Spor
 Runners-up /1): 2020–21

 Turkish Women's Second Football League
 Beşiktaş J.K.
 Winners (1): 2015–16

Turkish Women's Third Football League
 Beşiktaş J.K.
 Winners (1): 2014–05

International 
UEFA Development Tournament
 Turkey women's U-19
 Winners (1): 2016

References

External links 

1999 births
Living people
Citizens of Azerbaijan through descent
Azerbaijani women's footballers
Women's association football midfielders
Azerbaijan women's international footballers
Azerbaijani people of Turkish descent
People from Bahçelievler, Istanbul
Footballers from Istanbul
Turkish women's footballers
Beşiktaş J.K. women's football players
Fatih Vatan Spor players
Turkish Women's Football Super League players
Turkish people of Azerbaijani descent
Sportspeople of Azerbaijani descent